The Federal Reserve Bank of Minneapolis Helena Branch is the only branch of the Federal Reserve Bank of Minneapolis. The branch was opened on 1 Feb. 1921. At the time of opening, the city had a population of 12,377 making it the smallest city to have a Federal Reserve bank or branch.

The branch is located in Helena, Montana, in a     3-level facility which sits on 4 acres.

Current Board of Directors
The following people are on the board of directors as of 2013:

Appointed by the Federal Reserve Bank

Appointed by the Board of Governors

See also

 Federal Reserve Act
 Federal Reserve System
 Federal Reserve Districts
 Federal Reserve Branches
 Federal Reserve Bank of Minneapolis
 Structure of the Federal Reserve System

References

Federal Reserve branches